Peru competed at the 2004 Summer Paralympics in Athens, Greece. The team included 5 athletes, 4 men and 1 women. Competitors from Peru won two bronze medals to finish 71st in the medal table.

Medalists

Sports

Athletics

Men's field

Equestrian

Powerlifting

Swimming

See also
Peru at the Paralympics
Peru at the 2004 Summer Olympics

References 

Nations at the 2004 Summer Paralympics
2004
Summer Paralympics